Edward David Siggery (born 18 July 1991) is a rugby union player at Pontypridd RFC in the Welsh Premiership, where he plays at flanker.

Born in Carmarthen, Siggery worked his way through the Scarlets Academy, winning caps in the process for Wales at under 16, under 18 and under 20 level.

He also turned out for the Scarlets region's three clubs, Llanelli RFC, Carmarthen Quins RFC and Llandovery RFC.

In 2010, Siggery enlisted to study at the University of Glamorgan in Pontypridd, enabling his move to Pontypridd RFC.

Siggery departed Pontypridd in 2011 following an offer from London Irish Academy.

Siggery returned to Pontypridd at the beginning of the 2012/13 season.

External links 
Pontypridd player profile
London Irish player profile

1991 births
Living people
London Irish players
Pontypridd RFC players
Rugby union players from Carmarthen
Welsh rugby union players
Rugby union flankers